The Broward County Sheriff's Office (BSO) is a public safety organization With 5,400 employees, it is the largest sheriff's department in the state of Florida. Sheriff Gregory Tony heads the agency. BSO was one of the United States' largest fully-accredited sheriff's departments before losing accreditation (by unanimous vote) in 2019. Uniquely, the BSO also operates the county fire department and emergency medical services, the Broward Sheriff Fire Rescue (BSFR).

Structure and roles
The Broward County Sheriff's Office (BSO) is responsible for law enforcement and civil protection in Broward County. The BSO also oversees the fire department and emergency medical services for Broward County.

The BSO's Department of Law Enforcement covers areas including the Broward County Courthouse, the Ft. Lauderdale-Hollywood International Airport, areas of the Everglades and the county's waterways, unincorporated Broward, and 13 cities and towns that contracted for BSO law enforcement services. It also administers the Marine and Dive Rescue Unit, Motorcycle Unit, and Crime Lab. BSO also provides 9-1-1 intake, but the county's agreement with it to provide that service expired at the end of 2022.

History
The BSO was founded in 1915. In 2003, the BSO took control of Broward County Fire Rescue, Port Everglades Fire Rescue, and the Ft. Lauderdale/ Hollywood International Airport Fire Rescue departments.

Stoneman Douglas High School shooting

Following a deadly mass shooting at Marjory Stoneman Douglas High School in February 2018, the Broward County Sheriff's Office was criticized by some for its response. 

Some of the criticism was directed at Sheriff Scott Israel for the Broward County Sheriff's Office not addressing warnings about the suspected gunman, despite the teenager's lengthy record of threatening behavior from the age of nine. The sheriff's department had received 19 calls over the span of a decade relating to Cruz (some when Cruz was as young as nine years old; they ranged from a call to the police reporting that Cruz was cursing, to a call saying he had shot a chicken with a BB gun). 

In response to some of the calls, deputies met with Cruz’s mother. A Marjory Stoneman Douglas High School BSO resource deputy had an investigator for the Florida Department of Children and Families speak to Cruz in 2016, but Cruz's therapist said that Cruz was “not currently a threat to himself or others” and did not need to be committed, a mental health counselor said Cruz did not meet the criteria under Florida law that allows the police to commit a mentally ill person against their will, Stoneman Douglas High School conducted a “threat assessment” on Cruz after the counselor’s report, and the Florida Department of Children and Families ultimately concluded that Cruz was not a threat because he was living with his mother, attending school, and seeing a counselor. The FBI, for its part, admitted that it had received a tip (saying the caller suspected Cruz would shoot up a school) that its protocols required the FBI to further investigate, but that the FBI had failed to do so. 

Broward County Sheriff's Office Deputies were criticized for staying outside the school, and not immediately confronting the gunman. During the shooting, an armed sheriff's deputy was outside of the school, but did not enter. Afterward Israel criticized the deputy, saying that he should have "went in, addressed the killer, killed the killer". It was later discovered that there may have been at least two other deputies, who arrived later, who also did not enter the building. Coral Springs police officers who arrived at the scene were surprised to find that the deputies still had not entered the building. A Florida sheriff on a reviewing panel said that several of the Broward deputies on the scene failed to take command, and seemed disengaged or were distracted or failed to act at all, driving back and forth outside the school during the shooting. Disciplinary action was taken against various deputies. 

This was followed by resignations of several police officers who had responded to the scene, and Israel's suspension 11 months later by new Governor Ron DeSantis. A commission appointed by then-Governor Rick Scott to investigate the shooting condemned the police inaction, and urged school districts across the state to adopt greater measures of security.

Conflict between sheriffs and deputies

Under Scott Israel
Scott Israel received a vote of no-confidence linked to the mishandling of the Stoneman Douglas High School shooting, the first such vote in the Department's history. The Broward Sheriff's Office Deputies Association voted 534–94 against Israel, with union President Jeff Bell vowing to ask Governor Rick Scott to consider removing Israel and praising the "great courage" of members who voted "under threat of retaliation and reprisal." Scott took no action.

Israel described the no confidence vote as a "political stunt" intended to help the union in salary bargaining with the department, at that time underway. Bell denied this. The largest union of sheriff's office employees, the Federation of Public Employees, which does not represent any sworn law enforcement employees, gave Israel a vote of confidence.

On January 11, 2019, Florida Governor Ron DeSantis, three days after his inauguration, announced that he had signed an executive order suspending Sheriff Scott Israel because of his department's handling of the 2018 Stoneman Douglas High School shooting. DeSantis appointed former Coral Springs Police Sergeant Gregory Tony as sheriff to replace Israel.

Under Gregory Tony

On January 11, 2019, days after Florida Governor DeSantis took office, he appointed Tony the Sheriff of Broward County. 

Tony ran to be elected to a full term in the 2020 Democratic primary, which practically guarantees election in democratic Broward. Israel, Al Pollock, Willie Jones, Andrew Maurice Smalling, and Santiago Vazquez also competed in the election. While the Sun-Sentinel, Broward County's leading newspaper, endorsed Israel, Tony narrowly prevailed – winning 37% of the vote to Israel's 35%. Tony defeated Wayne Clark in the general election with 63% of the vote.

Tony made police reform the central issue of his campaign.
In his first campaign advertisement he stated that he "suspended and fired some deputies accused of excessive force. He fired Christopher Krickovich after the department Professional Standards Committee recommended he be exonerated, and he replaced all the members of the Committee except for Jeff Bell." He fired "at least five deputies" for misconduct. He also fired deputies Kevin Fanti and Jorge Sobrino. Tony fired deputies Brian Miller, Edward Eason, and Joshua Stambaugh for neglect of duty during the Stoneman Douglas High School shooting.

On April 3, 2020, Broward deputy Shannon Bennett, 39, died from COVID-19 which he contracted in the line of duty during the COVID-19 pandemic in Florida. As of April 5, more than a dozen Sheriff's Office employees had tested positive. On April 7, Deputy Union president Jeff Bell published a column in the Sun Sentinel, accusing Tony of poor leadership and specifically not providing deputies with sufficient personal protective equipment and Tony's failure to respond to their memos about the situation, a charge Tony denied in a news conference held the same day. Tony referred to Bell as a "rogue employee", who, although a deputy, works full time for the union and "hasn't worn a uniform in years". Tony described Bell's actions as "dishonorable" because of his attempt, in Tony's words, to use Bennett's death "to politicize and capitalize on a moment when we lost one of our own".

On April 10, Tony suspended Jeff Bell indefinitely with pay, "saying he made false statements, has corrupt practices, has exhibited conduct that is unbecoming and has not used proper discretion", and started an Internal Affairs case. Tony then terminated the union president in January 2022. 

On April 15 there were 77 positive coronavirus cases reported in the department.

On April 20, the Deputies union released the results of a 693–93 vote of no confidence in Tony, and the Lieutenants union, also citing the lack of personal protective equipment, a vote of 33–5. 

On June 3, 2020, the union wrote governor DeSantis to formally request that Tony be removed. The governor did not take any action.

Programs

Domestic violence prevention

Broward County Sheriff's Office works in partnership with Women in Distress (WID) to prevent domestic violence. WID is a nationally accredited, state-certified, full service domestic violence center in Broward County that provides victims of domestic violence with safe shelter, crisis intervention and resources, and to educate the community in order to Stop Abuse For Everyone (SAFE) through intervention, education and advocacy.

Media 
The Broward County Sheriff's Office was featured prominently in the first season of COPS in 1989.

District offices 

Central Broward
Cooper City
Court Services
Dania Beach
Deerfield Beach
Ft. Lauderdale-Hollywood International Airport
Lauderdale-By-The-Sea
Lauderdale Lakes
North Lauderdale
Oakland Park
Parkland
West Park
Pompano Beach
Port Everglades
Tamarac
Weston and Unincorporated West Broward

Fire stations

List of sheriffs

A.W. Turner (1915 - 1925)
Paul C. Bryan (1925 - 1927)
A.W. Turner (1927 - 1931)
Walter Clark (1931 - 1939)
Eddie Lee (1939 - 1940)
Walter Clark (1941 - 1950)
Amos Hall (1951 - 1957)
J.A. "Quill" Lloyd (1957 - 1961)
Allen B. Michell (1961 - 1968)
Thomas Walker (1968)
Edward J. Stack (1969 - 1979)
Robert Butterworth (1979 - 1982)
George Brescher (1983 - 1985)
Nick Navarro (1985 - 1993)
Ron Cochran (1993 - 1997)
Ken Jenne (1997 - 2007)
Al Lamberti (2007 - 2013)
Scott Israel (2013 – 2019)
Gregory Tony (2019–present)

See also

List of law enforcement agencies in Florida
County sheriff (Florida)

References

External links
Broward Sheriff's Office (BSO) Official Website

Broward County, Florida
Fire departments in Florida
Sheriffs' departments of Florida
1915 establishments in Florida